Richard Neville, 5th Earl of Salisbury (1400 – 31 December 1460) was an English nobleman and magnate based in northern England who became a key supporter of the House of York during the early years of the Wars of the Roses. He was the father of Richard Neville, 16th Earl of Warwick, the "Kingmaker".

Origins

He was born in 1400 at Raby Castle in County Durham, the third son (and tenth child) of Ralph de Neville, 1st Earl of Westmorland, by his second wife, Joan Beaufort, the youngest of the four legitimised children and only daughter of John of Gaunt, 1st Duke of Lancaster (third surviving son of King Edward III), by his mistress, later wife, Katherine Swynford.

The Neville lands were primarily in County Durham and Yorkshire, but both King Richard II and King Henry IV (Joan's cousin and half-brother respectively) found the family useful to counterbalance the strength of the Percys on the Scottish Borders. This led to Ralph's earldom being granted in 1397, and to his appointment as Warden of the West March in 1403. 

Ralph's marriage to Joan Beaufort, at a time when the distinction between royalty and nobility was becoming more important, can be seen as another reward; as a granddaughter of King Edward III, she was a member of the royal family.

The children of Ralph's first wife, Margaret Stafford, made good marriages to local nobility, and his eldest son had married into royalty in the person of Elizabeth Holland, but his Beaufort children married into even greater families. Three of Richard's sisters married dukes, the youngest Cecily, married Richard, Duke of York.

Marriage

Richard married Alice Montagu, daughter and heiress of Thomas Montagu, 4th Earl of Salisbury. The date of Richard and Alice's marriage is not known, but it must have been before February 1421, when as a married couple they appeared at the coronation of Queen Catherine of Valois. At the time of the marriage, the Salisbury inheritance was not guaranteed, as not only was Thomas Montacute still alive, but in 1424 he remarried (to Alice Chaucer, granddaughter of the poet Geoffrey Chaucer). This second marriage was without issue and when Thomas Montagu died in 1428, Richard Neville and Alice were confirmed as the Earl and Countess of Salisbury.

Salisbury came into possession of greater estates than, as a younger son under primogeniture, he could reasonably have expected. Strangely, his eldest half-brother John Neville apparently agreed to many of the rights to the Neville inheritance being transferred to his step-mother Joan Beaufort, and her son Salisbury inherited these on her death in 1440. 

He also gained possession of the lands and grants made jointly to Ralph and Joan. Ralph's heir (his grandson Ralph Neville, 2nd Earl of Westmorland) as the representative of the senior line, disputed the loss of his inheritance, and although he agreed to a settlement in 1443, it was on unequal terms – Salisbury kept the great Neville possessions of Middleham and Sheriff Hutton, as well as the more recent grant of Penrith. 

Only Raby Castle, the family's most ancient possession, returned to the senior branch. The resultant Neville–Neville feud was later to become absorbed into the destructive Percy-Neville feud. Salisbury's marriage gained him his wife's quarter share of the Holland inheritance. Ironically, his Salisbury title came with comparatively little in terms of wealth, though he did gain a more southerly residence at Bisham Manor in Berkshire.

Warden of the West March

The defence of the Scottish Border was carried out by two Wardens – that of the East March (based at Berwick-upon-Tweed) and that of the West March at Carlisle. Both offices had been held by the Percy family in the fourteenth century, and their support of King Henry IV seemed to have paid off in 1399, when Henry Percy, 1st Earl of Northumberland was appointed Warden of the West March and his son Henry Percy ("Hotspur") as Warden of the East March. But Hotspur rebelled, and his father was held to be complicit in his treason. 

After Hotspur was killed at the Battle of Shrewsbury in 1403, Ralph Neville was employed by King Henry V to capture the elder Percy. His reward was to succeed the Percys as Warden of both Marches. Under King Henry V, the Percys were restored to their lands, and eventually in 1417, to the East March.
 
Salisbury became a Knight Bachelor and was named Warden of the West March in 1420. It was one of the most valuable appointments in England, worth £1,500 in peacetime and four times that if war broke out with Scotland. Although unlike Calais, it did not require a permanent garrison, the incessant raiding and border skirmishes meant that there would always be a ready supply of trained and experienced soldiers at the Warden's command. Salisbury must have been high in Henry V's estimation, as he was also appointed Justice of the Peace in Cumberland, Westmoreland, and Durham. In 1431, he accompanied the young King Henry VI to France for his coronation, and on his return was made Warden of the East March. 

In 1436, he resigned from both posts, although this may have originally been intended as a means of forcing the crown to make good its arrears of payment. When his resignation was accepted, he accompanied his brother-in-law Richard, Duke of York, to France, taking 1,300 men-at-arms and archers with him. He returned the following year, and in November became a member of the King's Council. 

He did not resume either of the Wardenships, as the Percy-Neville dispute took up most of his time, but when this was resolved in 1443 he resumed the Wardenship of the West March. Although this was at a reduced fee of just under £1,000, the money was secured on specific sources of Crown income, not on the frequently uncollectable tallies. 

He was invested as a Knight of the Order of the Garter (K.G.) in 1436. He was invested as a Privy Counsellor (P.C.) the following year, in 1437.

Neville and Percy

At the end of 1443, from his principal seat at Middleham Castle in Wensleydale, Salisbury could look with some satisfaction at his position. He was a member of the King's Council and Warden of the West March. His brother Robert Neville was the Bishop of Durham, and another of his brothers, William Neville, 1st Earl of Kent, had the custody of Roxburgh Castle. He had seven children, four boys and three girls. In 1436 the two oldest children, Cicely and Richard, made excellent marriages to the son and daughter of Richard de Beauchamp, 13th Earl of Warwick.

It was becoming apparent that the rise of the Nevilles was coming to an end. The king, who during the late 1430s had started to exercise personal rule, was more concerned to promote the fortunes of his closest relatives – and Salisbury was only related by a junior, legitimised and female line. In this context, the local rivalry between the Nevilles and the Percys in the north of England was likely to take on greater importance. A strong and capable ruler would be able to control such feuds, or even profit from them. A weak king could find the disputes spreading from local to regional or national conflict.

The Percys had lands throughout northern England, while the northern lands of the Nevilles were concentrated in north Yorkshire and in County Durham. As Warden of the West March, Salisbury was in a position to exert great power in the northwest, in spite of holding only Kendal and Penrith. The Percys resented the fact that their tenants in Cumberland and Westmorland were being recruited by Salisbury, who even with the reduced grant of 1443 still had great spending power in the region. The senior Neville line (now related by marriage to the Percys) still resented the inequitable settlement of their inheritance dispute.

The fifteenth century could be regarded as the peak of "bastard feudalism" – when every subject needed a "good lord". In return for a commitment by the retained man to provide (usually) military support, the lord would give his retainer a small annual fee, a badge or item of clothing to mark his loyalty (livery) and provide help for him in his disputes with his neighbours (maintenance). Northern England was a long way from the Palace of Westminster, and rapid legal redress for wrongs was impossible. With his economic power as Warden, Salisbury could provide better support for Percy tenants than Northumberland, unpaid in regard to the East March for years, could hope to.

In 1448, during the renewal of the war with Scotland, Northumberland took his forces through Salisbury's West March – a grave breach of etiquette. Northumberland was defeated at the Battle of Sark, and his son Henry Percy, Lord Poynings was captured. The fact that Salisbury lost 2,000 horses trying to respond to this attack, and was then excluded (along with Northumberland) from the subsequent peace negotiations, can only have inflamed relations between the two families. Over time, the ill will might have receded, but Northumberland's second son, Thomas Percy, Lord Egremont, spent the next few years stirring up trouble in Yorkshire – particularly at York, situated between the Percy estates of Spofforth and Healaugh, and Neville's castle at Sheriff Hutton.

On 24 August 1453, Thomas Percy, Lord Egremont, assembled a force of men-at-arms and archers perhaps as large as 1,000 strong, intending to waylay Salisbury and his family at Heworth Moor, outside York, as he made for Sheriff Hutton.  Salisbury had been attending the wedding of his son Thomas in Tattershall Castle, Lincolnshire, and although his escort would have been smaller, it would have been better armed than Egremont's York craftsmen and tradesmen. Salisbury and his retinue fought them back, arriving unscathed at Sheriff Hutton, but the episode marked the beginning of what was virtually a private war. The bride, Maud Stanhope, was the widow of Lord Willoughby of Eresby, his son would become a Yorkist. Another of the Yorkist party, John Neville, was later Lord Montagu.  Maud was due to inherit the manors of Wressle and Burwell from her uncle, Lord Cromwell, who had obtained them from the Percys through litigation. Historian John Sadler argues this was the first incident in the Yorkist/Lancastrian affinities lawless squabble leading to civil war.

Neville and York
Salisbury changed his allegiance to Richard, Duke of York, who made him Lord Chancellor in 1455. This enabled Salisbury to advance the interests of his retainers against the Percies; for example Thomas de la More petitioned against Lord Egremont, whom de la More claimed had threatened to kill him years earlier. When King Henry VI tried to assert his independence and dismiss York as Protector, Salisbury joined him in fighting at the First Battle of St Albans, claiming that he was acting in self-defence. In 1458 he participated in The Love Day, an attempt at reconciliation held in London. He was notably successful in the Battle of Blore Heath, but after the Yorkist army collapsed in the Rout of Ludford Bridge, Salisbury escaped to Calais, having been specifically excluded from a royal pardon. He returned to England with York in 1460, and was slain on 30–31 December 1460, the night after the Battle of Wakefield.

Death and burial
After the defeat of the Yorkists at the Battle of Wakefield, Salisbury himself escaped the battlefield but was captured during the night. Upon discovery, battle-worn and now a traitor to the realm, he was taken to the Lancastrian camp. Although due to his great wealth, the Lancastrian nobles might have been prepared to allow Salisbury to ransom himself, he was nevertheless dragged out of Pontefract Castle and beheaded by the local population, to whom he had been a harsh overlord.

He was buried first at Pontefract, but his sons transferred his body to the family mausoleum at Bisham Priory in Berkshire where they erected a monument to his memory. The effigy from this was brought to St Mary's Church at Burghfield, near Reading, after the Dissolution of the Monasteries. The effigy of a lady alongside him wears a headdress which is not thought to be of the right date to be his wife, but she may represent one of the earlier Countesses of Salisbury buried at Bisham.

Marriage and issue

He married Alice Montacute (1407-1462), daughter and heiress of Thomas Montacute, 4th Earl of Salisbury (1388-1428), by whom he had twelve children:

Sons
Richard Neville, 16th Earl of Warwick (1428–1471), "The Kingmaker", eldest son and heir, who married Lady Anne Beauchamp and had issue.
Sir Thomas Neville (c. 1429–1460), who was knighted in 1449 and died at the Battle of Wakefield. He was the second husband of Maud Stanhope (30 August 1497), who married firstly Robert Willoughby, 6th Baron Willoughby de Eresby (died 25 July 1452), and thirdly Sir Gervase Clifton, beheaded 6 May 1471 after the Battle of Tewkesbury.
John Neville, 1st Marquess of Montagu (c. 1431–1471), married Isabel Ingaldesthorpe and had issue.
George Neville (1432–1476), who became Archbishop of York and Chancellor of England.
Ralph Neville (b. 1440 approx.), did not survive infancy
Robert Neville (b. 1446 approx.), did not survive infancy

Daughters
Joan Neville (c. 1424–1462), who married William FitzAlan, 16th Earl of Arundel, and had issue.
Cecily Neville (c. 1425–1450), who married Henry Beauchamp, 1st Duke of Warwick (1425–1446), and by him had one daughter, Anne Beauchamp, 15th Countess of Warwick (1444–1449), on whose death her title passed to her paternal aunt, who in turn had married her maternal uncle Richard Neville (below named).
Alice Neville (c. 1430–1503), who married Henry FitzHugh, 5th Baron FitzHugh. Their daughter, Elizabeth, married William Parr, thus making them great-grandparents of Catherine Parr, sixth wife of King Henry VIII.
Eleanor Neville (c. 1438–before 1472), who married Thomas Stanley, 1st Earl of Derby, and had issue.
Katherine Neville (1442–1504), who married first William Bonville, 6th Baron Harington, and second William Hastings, 1st Baron Hastings, had issue.
Margaret Neville (c. 1444–1506), who married John de Vere, 13th Earl of Oxford.

Ancestry

References

Sources

Further reading

External links
 Royal Berkshire History: Richard Neville, Earl of Salisbury (1400–1460)
 Sir Richard Neville, 5th Earl of Salisbury
 War of the Roses: Richard Neville, Earl of Salisbury (1400–1460)

|-

1400 births
1460 deaths
15th-century English nobility
Burials at Bisham Abbey
Neville
Executed people from County Durham
English knights
Knights Bachelor
Knights of the Garter
Lord chancellors of England
Members of the Privy Council of England
Richard
Peers jure uxoris
People executed under the Lancastrians
People executed under the Plantagenets by decapitation
People from Bisham
People of the Wars of the Roses
People from Staindrop
Younger sons of earls
Barons Monthermer
Barons Montagu